Madison West High School is a comprehensive four-year high school in Madison, Wisconsin, founded in 1930. Its athletics teams compete in the WIAA Big Eight Conference.

Madison West serves students from four municipalities: Madison, the town of Madison, Shorewood Hills and Fitchburg.

Academics
Madison West's advanced placement classes include French Language and Culture, Spanish Language and Culture, Spanish Literature and Culture, German Language and Culture, U.S. Government & Politics, U.S. History, European History, Statistics, Calculus AB, Calculus BC, Computer Science Principles, Computer Science A, Physics 2, Chemistry, Biology, Environmental Science, and Music Theory.

Extracurricular activities

Rocket club
Madison West Rocket Club was started in 2003. In 2009, 2012, and 2019 it placed first in the Team America Rocketry Challenge (TARC) national finals. In 2020, the club submitted a proposal to the Ken Sousa Memorial Grant Contest to study the effects of space flight on organisms by sending slime molds into suborbital flight. The club is currently working on Project Ariadne, putting slime mold through the stress of going on a suborbital flight and studying its ability to solve mazes and develop pathways. Other parts of the club are working on Team America Rocketry Challenge and R4S.

Science Olympiad
The Madison West Science Olympiad team began in 1985. The West team placed in the top 10 in the national tournament in three consecutive years from 1989 to 1991, placing 2nd in 1989. The team also finished first in the state tournament in 2012 and 2013. From 1989 to 2019 the Madison West team won state 19 times, placed second 15 times, and were invited to the national tournament 24 times.

Math team
The Madison West Math Team took first place in the 2015 state math meet. In 2016, they took first in the state math meet, the Wisconsin Math League, and the International Online "Purple Comet! Math Meet" for Wisconsin (20th in the U.S.).

Athletics 
Madison West's athletic teams are known as the Regents, and compete in the Wisconsin Interscholastic Athletic Association's Big Eight Conference. The Regents have won a WIAA-record 92 state championships.

Notable alumni

 Jim Bakken – former NFL place kicker, St. Louis Cardinals
 Tammy Baldwin – U.S. Representative and U.S. Senator
 Carol A. Buettner – Wisconsin State Senator
 Alex Compton – former Philippine Basketball Association player and head coach 
 Jeff Conrad – drummer for the band Phantom Planet
 Jim Doyle, class of 1963 – 44th Governor of Wisconsin
 Reece Gaines – former NBA guard, Orlando Magic, Houston Rockets, Milwaukee Bucks
 Alexander R. Grant – Wisconsin State Representative
 Beth Heiden – Olympic Bronze Medalist speed skater in the 1980 Winter Olympic Games; professional cyclist
 Eric Heiden – Olympic Gold Medalist speed skater at the 1980 Winter Olympic Games; professional cyclist
 Phil Hellmuth – professional poker player
 Dan Immerfall – Olympic speed skater 1976 Winter Olympic Games, 1980 Winter Olympic Games
 Daniel Kane – Mathematician Morgan Prize (2007), Putnam Fellow (2003–06)
 Awonder Liang – Chess player, third youngest American to qualify for the title of Grandmaster
 Fred Lerdahl, composer and music theorist
 Barbara Lorman – Wisconsin State Senator
 Denny Love – actor
 David Maraniss – journalist and author
 K. T. McFarland – Deputy National Security Advisor
 Dalia Mogahed – Director of Research at the Institute for Social Policy and Understanding 
 Ward Moorehouse – anti-corporate activist, publisher 
 Jay Mortenson – Olympic gold medalist in swimming at 1988 Summer Olympic Games
 Cyrus Nowrasteh – filmmaker
 Sarayu Rao – actress
 John Reynolds – actor and writer
 Sarah T. Roberts – researcher
 David L. Rose – U.S. business executive
 Leo Sidran – musician
 Charles P. Smith – Wisconsin State Treasurer
 John Stamstad – bike racer and trail runner, member of the Mountain Bike Hall of Fame
 Scott Stantis – editorial cartoonist for The Chicago Tribune and creator of the comic strips The Buckets and Prickly City
 Tim Stracka – former NFL tight end, Cleveland Browns
 Mike Sui – actor
 Chris Tallman – actor
 Donnel Thompson – former NFL linebacker, Pittsburgh Steelers, Indianapolis Colts
 Tim Van Galder – former NFL quarterback, St. Louis Cardinals
 Stu Voigt – former NFL tight end, Minnesota Vikings
 J.D. Walsh – actor
 Marc Webb – film director
 Bob Whitsitt – general manager of the Portland Trail Blazers and the Seattle SuperSonics in the NBA; the Seattle Seahawks in the NFL
 Ben Wikler – chair of the Democratic Party of Wisconsin

References

External links

School website
District website

High schools in Madison, Wisconsin
Educational institutions established in 1930
Public high schools in Wisconsin
1930 establishments in Wisconsin